Nathan Felix (born 1981) is a classical music composer from Austin, Texas. He now resides in San Antonio. He is also the band leader for The Noise Revival Orchestra.

Career
Felix's symphonies have been performed in Bulgaria, Portugal, Denmark, Mongolia and the United States with a performance of his 2nd Symphony, Neon Heaven, at SPOT Festival.

In 2013, his 1st Symphony, The Curse the Cross & the Lion, was featured by the BBC and later made into a documentary entitled The Curse & The Symphony. The documentary has screened at 28 film festivals, and was picked up by Gaiam TV.  In 2015, PBS affiliate KLRU featured Felix's 6-Piano Project on an episode of Arts in Context, in which he restored abandoned pianos to premiere his works written for six pianos and then donated the pianos to lower-income schools in Austin. 6-Pianos was nominated for a Lone Star Emmy in 2016. The 6-Piano Project has since been presented in San Antonio (2016), Barcelona (2017), Melbourne (2017) and Houston (2019).

In 2018, Felix premiered his Headphone Opera entitled The War Bride at Luminaria Festival in San Antonio with two concerts. Based on the memoir of Felix's grandmother, Jean Groundsell-Contreras, The War Bride examines the subject of immigration in the 1940s during World War II and in the present time. Felix also expanded on his music for six pianos with music for a musitronic six-sided keyboard and choir entitled Yachting with the Kennedys.

In 2020, Felix released Öcalan, a chamber opera inspired by Kurdish Political Activist, Abdullah Öcalan.

In 2021, Felix premiered his chamber opera, Ribas-Dominicci, on Texas Public Radio. Ribas-Dominicci, is inspired by the life of Major Fernando Luis Ribas-Dominicci, a pilot in the U.S. Air Force who was killed during Operation El Dorado Canyon in 1986. In November, Texas Skies, featuring music for two pianos was released with Timo Andres as pianist.

In 2022, Felix premiered two new Latinx operas for hispanic heritage month, La Malinche - Traitor Savior, at Albuquerque Museum of Art and History and No. 5, an opera about the loves of fashion designer Coco Chanel in Orlando.

Felix serves as music director for the San Antonio choir From Those Who Follow the Echoes, which premiered Felix’s Opera on a Bus.

Personal life
He is of Mexican-American descent.

Discography

Albums
2013 The Curse the Cross & the Lion
2015 Electrochestral
2016 Neon Heaven
2017 Hard Reset
2019 The War Bride
2020 Öcalan
2021 Texas Skies
2022 Santa-Almada

References

External links 
 

American male classical composers
American classical composers
American musicians of Mexican descent
Hispanic and Latino American musicians
Living people
1981 births
Musicians from Austin, Texas
21st-century American composers
21st-century classical composers
Classical musicians from Texas
21st-century American male musicians